Blasted Land is an adventure for fantasy role-playing games published by Mayfair Games in 1983.

Contents
In the Blasted Land scenario, the player characters journey across the desert from Latoon to the Tower of Stars.  Finding the three keys that allow entrance to the tower, they must fight their way through the tower's defenders to close a magical portal.

Publication history
Blasted Land was written by Mark Mulkins and Paul Karczag, and was published by Mayfair Games in 1983 as a 28-page book with an outer folder. A tournament scenario, Blasted Land was produced in a limited edition of 1,000 copies for Dallcon in 1983.

Reception

References

Fantasy role-playing game adventures
Role Aids
Role-playing game supplements introduced in 1983